Zyraxes was a Getae king who ruled the northern part of what is today Dobrogea in the 1st century BC. He was mentioned in relation with the campaigns of  Marcus Licinius Crassus (grandson of the triumvir). His capital, Genucla, was besieged by the Romans in 28 BC, but he managed to escape and flee to his Scythian allies.

Earlier, Antonius Hybrida, the governor of Moesia, was defeated beneath the walls of Histria in 61 BC. The Getae under Zyraxes and the bastarnae of Scythia were allied with the Histrians, but it seems that the main victors of this conflict were the Getae, as they were the keepers of the battle trophies and brought them back to Genucla, Zyraxes' capital.

The trophies were recovered by Marcus Licinius Crassus when he attacked the Genucla fortress, situated somewhere on the bank of the Danube, in 28 BC. Zyraxes knew well enough that he could not hold on his own and retreated across the Danube to the Bastarnae (Scythians), with whom he was allied, while also taking the treasure with him. The fortress fell in his absence, after a brief but hard siege.

References

Dicţionar de istorie veche a României ("Dictionary of ancient Romanian history") (1976) Editura Ştiinţifică şi Enciclopedică, pp. 625

Dacian kings
History of Dobruja
1st-century BC rulers in Europe